The Rumpler 6B was a German single-engine floatplane fighter with a biplane wing structure, designed and built by Rumpler Flugzeugwerke, in Berlin Johannisthal and introduced in 1916.

Design and development
Born out of a requirement of the Kaiserliche Marine (Imperial Navy) for a seaplane fighter, the Rumpler 6B was, like its contemporaries the Albatros W.4 and Hansa-Brandenburg W.9, an adaptation of an existing landplane design. In Rumpler's case the new floatplane fighter was based on the company's two-seat C.I reconnaissance aircraft. The modifications included adding a forward stagger to the wings, removal of the second (observer's) cockpit and fitting a larger rudder to offset the increased side area caused by the addition of floats. In the production aircraft, the area of the horizontal tail surfaces was also slightly reduced. The armament consisted of a fixed, forward-firing 7.92 mm (.312 in) LMG 08/15 "Spandau" machine gun mounted on port side of the engine block.

The initial version of the fighter was the 6B1. A total of 39 of these were produced, with all but one of the number having been delivered by the end of May 1917. A new version of the basic design, the 6B2, was introduced in October 1917. These aircraft retained the Mercedes D.III engine, but otherwise they were based on the C.IV, with larger dimensions and more rounded horizontal tail surfaces. In spite of the decrease in performance, 49 of this type were delivered between October 1917 and January 1918, during which time the remaining 6B1 also left the factory.

Operational history
The Rumpler 6Bs were mostly employed at German seaplane bases at Ostend and Zeebrugge. Some were also sent to the Black Sea area to fight the Russians.

Use in Bulgaria
The two 6B1 naval fighters stationed at the German Naval Air Station Peynerdjik near Varna on the Black Sea were transferred in June 1918 to the Bulgarian Navy. They were used after the war in minesweeping operations. In 1920, they were destroyed in accordance with the clauses of the Peace Treaty.

Use in Finland
In February 1918, the Finnish White Army ordered one Rumpler and seven other aircraft from Germany. The aircraft was destroyed in an accident in October 1919. Another Rumpler aircraft was bought from the Germans in Tallinn in 1918 and it was used for seven years.

Survivors
Hallinportti Aviation Museum has one Rumpler in storage.

Operators
 
Austro-Hungarian Navy
 
 Bulgarian Navy
 
 Finnish Air Force

Imperial German Navy

Royal Netherlands Navy

Specifications (6B1)

See also

References

Further reading

 
 </ref>

6B
1910s German fighter aircraft
Biplanes
Floatplanes
Single-engined tractor aircraft
Aircraft first flown in 1916